Googa Creek is a rural locality in the Toowoomba Region, Queensland, Australia. In the  Googa Creek had a population of 43 people.

History 
Googa Googa Creek State School opened on 9 May 1921 and closed on 1950.

A telephone service for Googa Creek was approved in 1947.

In the  Googa Creek had a population of 43 people.

On 1 February 2018, Googa Creek's postcode changed from 4306 to 4314.

Education 
There are no school in Googa Creek. The nearest primary school is Blackbutt State School in Blackbutt to the north-east. The nearest secondary schools are Yarraman State School (to Year 9) in Yarraman to the north-west and Nanango State High School (to Year 12) in Nanango to the north.

References 

Toowoomba Region
Localities in Queensland